Engelbert Arnold (7 March 1856 – 16 November 1911) was a Swiss-born electrical engineer. He was the first professor of the electrotechnical institute at the TH Karlsruhe (today KIT), which was founded under his supervision from 1896 until 1898.

Biography 
On 7 March 1856 Engelbert Arnold was born in Schlierbach (Swiss) as one of nine children. His father was a farmer. Arnold went to the Gymnasium in Beromünster, before he studied mechanical engineering at the ETH Zurich between 1874 and 1878. After several internships in Leipzig and Offenbach he became Carl Ludwig Moll’s assistant at the Technical University of Riga. He [Habilitation|habilitated] in 1883 and worked as a Privatdozent for mechanical and electrical engineering. In 1888 Arnold founded together with Heinrich Dettmann the Russian-baltic electrotechnical factory (german “Russisch-baltische Elektrotechnische Fabrik”) to build electric generators. In 1886 he published his book „Die Ankerwicklungen und Ankerkonstruktionen der Gleichstrom-Dynamomaschinen“ about electrical motors and generators (with focus on armature windings and the construction of armatures). Afterwards, in 1891, he replaced Charles Eugene Lancelot Brown as leading electrical engineer at Oerlikon. There he focused on the analysis and improvement of repulsion motors.
1892 Arnold got married with Helen Moll, daughter of his former professor Carl Ludwig Moll. They had a daughter together, who was born in 1899.
In 1894 he was announced professor at the TH Karlsruhe. Between 1899 and 1904 he built the first electrotechnical laboratory. In cooperation with his assistant Jens Lassen La Cour, he published his book on alternating current machines (german „Die Wechselstromtechnik“), which includes five volumes.
1905 he was appointed Geheimer Hofrat and he received the honorary doctor degree from Leibniz University Hannover. In 1906/1907 Arnold was rector of the TH Karlsruhe. Before Arnold died on 16 November 1911, he offered a professorship to Rudolf Richter, who took Arnolds place as head of the electrotechnical institute in 1912.

Publications 
 Die Ankerwicklungen der Gleichstrom-Dynamomaschinen : Entwicklung und Anwendung einer allgemein gültigen Schaltungsregel, 1891. PPN: 038578409.
  Die Ankerwicklungen und Ankerkonstruktionen der Gleichstrom-Dynamomaschinen,  1896. PPN: 084033991.
 with La Cour, J.L. Die Gleichstrommaschine: Theorie, Konstruktion, Berechnung, Untersuchung u. Arbeitsweise derselben, 1903. 2 Bände, PPN: 011375566.
 Engelbert Arnold (Hrsg.) Die Wechselstromtechnik. 5 Bände, PPN: 011367415.
 with La Cour, J.L. Die Kommutation bei Gleichstrom- und Wechselstrom-Kommutatormaschinen, 1906 (Sammlung elektrotechnischer Vorträge Band 9). PPN: 096728957.

Further reading 
 
 Klaus-Peter Koepke: Geschichte der Fridericiana – Stationen in der Geschichte der Universität Karlsruhe (TH) von der Gründung 1825 bis zum Jahr 2000. , Universitätsverlag Karlsruhe, 2007.

External links 
 
 
  at dgpt.org
Biographie auf der Website der Electrosuisse (PDF; 29 kB)
 100 Jahre Elektrotechnik an der Universität Karlsruhe (TH)

References 

Academic staff of the Karlsruhe Institute of Technology
Academic staff of Riga Technical University
Swiss electrical engineers
1911 deaths
1856 births
Swiss expatriates in the Russian Empire
Swiss expatriates in Germany